Aruna Dindane (born 26 November 1980) is an Ivorian former professional footballer who played as a striker.

He has 62 caps and 17 goals for the Ivory Coast since his debut in 2000, and has played at four Africa Cup of Nations and two FIFA World Cups.

Club career

Anderlecht
Born in Abidjan, Ivory Coast, Dindane was transferred from Ivorian club ASEC Mimosas to RSC Anderlecht in the summer of 2000 and helped the team to win the Belgian First Division Championship in 2001 and 2004, as well a Supercup in 2000 and 2001. In 2003, Dindane won both the Ebony Shoe as the best player of African origin in the Belgian League and the Golden Shoe as the best player in the Belgian League. In November 2004, he was given a Swan D'Or Award for a spell of back-to-back hat-tricks.

Lens
In June 2005, Dindane signed for French Ligue 1 club RC Lens.

Portsmouth
In August 2009, Dindane joined Premier League team Portsmouth on a one-year loan deal, with the option to sign him at the end of his loan spell. He scored his first goal for Portsmouth in a 3–1 League Cup win over Carlisle United on 22 September 2009. and his first Premier League goal as part of a hat-trick in the 4–0 win over Wigan Athletic on 31 October. On 5 December 2009, he scored against Burnley with a header after missing a penalty earlier in the game. On 9 February 2010, Dindane scored a 95th-minute equaliser in the 1–1 draw with Sunderland at Fratton Park.

On 21 March 2010, it was revealed he was left out of Portsmouth's match squad the previous day as, if he played one more game, the club would have to pay a £4 million fee to Lens. With Portsmouth in administration, they could not afford to pay this fee, and so he was dropped. However, he subsequently played in the FA Cup semi-final against Tottenham Hotspur on 11 April 2010, and Portsmouth were aiming to negotiate terms with Lens that allow him to play in the FA Cup Final and the remaining Premier League games without incurring the £4 million fee.

On 4 April 2010, it was revealed that Blackburn Rovers were preparing a £2.5 million bid for the striker in time for the 2010–11 season. Dindane underwent and passed a medical at the club, only for the transfer talk to cool due to financial disagreements between Blackburn and Lens. Dindane reiterated his desire to stay in English football after the loan to Portsmouth had ended. However, on 24 May 2010, Dindane agreed a three-year deal with Lekhwiya of Qatar.

Qatar
In January 2012, Dindane agreed to join Qatari club Al-Gharafa. After a short spell at Al-Gharafa, he signed a one-year deal with Al-Sailiya Sport Club on 27 May 2012.

Return to England
After half a season at Al-Sailiya, Dindane was released and started training with Leeds United. On 23 March 2013, he signed for Crystal Palace until the end of the 2012–13 season. He was released just prior to the end of the season without having made a senior appearance and with doubts over his fitness.

After retirement
After his retirement, Dindane worked as general secretary of the Association des Footballeurs Ivoiriens (Ivorian Footballers Association).

International career
Dindane made his debut for Ivory Coast on 9 April 2000 against Rwanda. He participated in the 2006 FIFA World Cup, where he scored twice in a memorable comeback to win 3–2 in their last group match against Serbia and Montenegro. However, the team failed to reach the second round due to previous defeats against Argentina and the Netherlands.

Dindane represented his country at the 2006 African Cup of Nations, but left the tournament on 22 January 2006 following the death of one of his twin daughters. He was also selected in the Ivorian squad for the 2008 African Cup of Nations in Ghana. He currently has 67 international caps for his country.

After Dindane's successful season in England for Portsmouth, where he scored 10 goals in 24 appearances, he was called up to the Ivorian squad for the 2010 FIFA World Cup. Dindane was a starter in their first two group games, against Portugal and Brazil.

Career statistics

International goals
Scores and results list Ivory Coast's goal tally first.

Honours
ASEC Mimosas
Côte d'Ivoire Premier Division: 2000
CAF Super Cup: 1999

Anderlecht
Belgian First Division: 2000–01, 2003–04
Belgian Supercup: 2000, 2001

Lens
UEFA Intertoto Cup: 2005
Ligue 2: 2008–09

Ivory Coast
Africa Cup of Nations runner-up: 2006

Individual
Belgian Ebony Shoe: 2003
Belgian Golden Shoe: 2003

References

External links

 
 
 Profile, stats and pictures of Aruna Dindane

1980 births
Living people
Footballers from Abidjan
Ivorian footballers
Ivory Coast international footballers
Association football forwards
ASEC Mimosas players
R.S.C. Anderlecht players
RC Lens players
Portsmouth F.C. players
Crystal Palace F.C. players
Expatriate footballers in France
2002 African Cup of Nations players
2006 FIFA World Cup players
2006 Africa Cup of Nations players
2008 Africa Cup of Nations players
2010 Africa Cup of Nations players
2010 FIFA World Cup players
Belgian Pro League players
Ligue 1 players
Ligue 2 players
Premier League players
Ivorian expatriate sportspeople in Belgium
Ivorian expatriate sportspeople in France
Expatriate footballers in Belgium
Ivorian expatriate sportspeople in England
Expatriate footballers in England
Ivorian expatriate footballers
Lekhwiya SC players
Expatriate footballers in Qatar
Qatar Stars League players
Ivorian expatriate sportspeople in Qatar
Al-Gharafa SC players
Al-Sailiya SC players
Ligue 1 (Ivory Coast) players
FA Cup Final players